Julian Brooke-Houghton (born 16 December 1946) is a British sailor. He won a silver medal in the Flying Dutchman Class with Rodney Pattisson at the 1976 Summer Olympics.

References
 

1946 births
Living people
British male sailors (sport)
Olympic sailors of Great Britain
Sailors at the 1976 Summer Olympics – Flying Dutchman
Olympic bronze medallists for Great Britain
Olympic medalists in sailing
Medalists at the 1976 Summer Olympics
Olympic silver medallists for Great Britain
Flying Dutchman class world champions
World champions in sailing for Great Britain